Nehemiah Knight (March 23, 1746June 13, 1808) was a United States representative from Rhode Island. He was born in Knightsville (a village later named after him) within the town of Cranston in the Colony of Rhode Island and Providence Plantations. He attended the common schools, engaged in agricultural pursuits, and was town clerk from 1773 to 1800. In 1783 and 1787 he was elected to the Rhode Island General Assembly, and was sheriff of Providence County in 1787.

Knight was elected as a Democratic-Republican to the Eighth, Ninth, and Tenth Congresses and served from March 4, 1803, until his death in Cranston in 1808; interment was in a small family cemetery now known as Cranston Historical Cemetery, number 21 in between 1757 and 1761 Cranston Street South of Phenix Avenue in the center of "Knightsville," Cranston, which is named for the family.

Nehemiah was married in 1762 to Eleanor Rice Hudson (1746–1823).  Their son, Nehemiah Rice Knight (1780–1854), would later become the Governor of Rhode Island and even later a U.S. Senator.

See also
List of United States Congress members who died in office (1790–1899)
Knightsville, Rhode Island

References

Politicians from Cranston, Rhode Island
1746 births
1808 deaths
Members of the Rhode Island House of Representatives
Rhode Island sheriffs
Democratic-Republican Party members of the United States House of Representatives from Rhode Island